Zádolí is a municipality and village in Ústí nad Orlicí District in the Pardubice Region of the Czech Republic. It has about 100 inhabitants.

Administrative parts
The village of Střihanov is an administrative part of Zádolí.

References

Villages in Ústí nad Orlicí District